Qara Kheyl (also Romanized as Qarā Kheyl; also known as Qovā Kheyl) is a village in Balatajan Rural District, in the Central District of Qaem Shahr County, Mazandaran Province, Iran. At the 2006 census, its population was 4,186, in 1,083 families.

References 

Populated places in Qaem Shahr County